Boroszów  (German: Boroschau, 1936–1945 Alteneichen) is a village in the administrative district of Gmina Olesno, within Olesno County, Opole Voivodeship, in south-western Poland.

In village is old wooden church.

References

Villages in Olesno County